Operation Sweep Clear V was a U.S. Navy fleet operation in Canadian waters during the Fall of 1960.

See also

 USS Bold (AM-424)

References

External links
 Dictionary of American Naval Fighting Ships

United States Navy in the 20th century